Stradi Parish is an administrative unit of Gulbene Municipality (prior to the 2009 administrative reforms Gulbene District), Latvia.

Towns, villages and settlements of Stradi parish 
  - parish administrative center

References 

Parishes of Latvia
Gulbene Municipality